"Song of the Patriot" is a song written by Marty Robbins and Shirl Milete and originally recorded and released by Johnny Cash (with Marty Robbins providing vocal harmony).

Released in 1980 as a single (Columbia 1-11283, with "She's a Go-er" on the B-side), the song reached number 54 on U.S. Billboard country chart for the week of July 5.

The song was included on Cash's 1981 compilation album Encore.

Track listing

Charts

References

External links 
 "Song of the Patriot" on the Johnny Cash official website

Johnny Cash songs
1980 songs
1980 singles
Songs written by Marty Robbins
Song recordings produced by Earl Poole Ball
Columbia Records singles